The 2016 AIBA Women's World Boxing Championships was held at Astana, Kazakhstan and took place between 19 and 27 May 2016.

Medal summary

Medal table

Medalists

References

External links
Official Website
Tournament Details and Results

 
2016
International boxing competitions hosted by Kazakhstan
Sport in Astana
2016 in Kazakhstani sport
2016 in women's boxing
May 2016 sports events in Asia